The Worthing Chronicle (1983) is a science fiction novel by American writer Orson Scott Card, part of The Worthing series.  This book by itself is out of print having been published along with nine short stories in the collection The Worthing Saga (1990).

Plot summary
Jason Worthing and one of his descendants, Justice, go to a small village on a backward world to get a boy named Lared to write a book for them.  This book is about why Abner Doon destroyed the empire and the planet Capitol and why Jason's descendants destroyed the planet Worthing.  It also explains why people all over the settled part of the galaxy are no longer being protected by "God" from pain and hardship.

The Worthing Chronicle is an expansion of Card's first novel, Hot Sleep.

Related Works
Capitol
Hot Sleep
The Worthing Saga

See also

List of works by Orson Scott Card
Orson Scott Card

External links
 About the novel The Worthing Chronicle from Card's website

1983 American novels
Novels by Orson Scott Card
1983 science fiction novels
American science fiction novels
Ace Books books